Isis was an American post-metal band, active from 1997 until their disbandment in 2010. They released five full-length albums, five extended plays (EPs), seven live albums, two singles, and have collaborated with other artists on numerous other projects.

Isis was formed in Boston, Massachusetts in late 1997 by Aaron Turner (guitar/vocals; also the owner of Hydra Head Records), Jeff Caxide (bass guitar), Chris Mereschuk (electronics/vocals) and Aaron Harris (drums). In 1998, they released a demo and their first EP, Mosquito Control, with this lineup. The band replaced Mereschuk with Jay Randall and added former Cast Iron Hike guitarist Michael Gallagher before releasing the 1999 EP The Red Sea. Bryant Clifford Meyer of The Gersch replaced Jay Randall in late 1999, and Isis remained with this lineup until their dissolution. Isis' debut full-length, Celestial, and its sister EP, SGNL>05, were released in 2000 and 2001, respectively.

In 2002, Oceanic was released to critical acclaim, and was the subject of a series of four vinyl reinterpretations by various contemporary artists; the series was consolidated into an Ipecac Recordings release, entitled Oceanic: Remixes & Reinterpretations. Growth in stature necessitated relocation to Los Angeles in 2003.  Panopticon was released in 2004, to further critical plaudits and an album of the year award from Rock Sound. It was also the band's first entry into the charts, peaking at number 47 in the Billboard Top Independent Albums chart.

Their next record, In the Absence of Truth, was released by Ipecac on October 31, 2006. This full-length charted more successfully, peaking at number six in Billboard's Top Heatseekers chart; however, critical reception was not particularly warm and the band themselves have expressed disappointment with the album. "Holy Tears" and "Not in Rivers, but in Drops" were released from the album as singles in 2008, along with a limited-edition vinyl compilation box set entitled Shades of the Swarm later in the year. Their final full-length, Wavering Radiant, was released in 2009 and marked the band's first entry in the Billboard 200, peaking at 98; it also saw international commercial exposure, seeing entry into the charts of the United Kingdom, Germany and Norway. Isis split up in June 2010, just before the release of a split EP with Melvins. Their entire back-catalogue of live releases saw digital re-release in mid-2011, and a compilation of demos and alternative versions of songs, called Temporal, was released on November 6, 2012 by Ipecac Recordings.

Albums

Studio albums

Live albums

Extended plays

Solo

Collaborative

Splits

Remixes

Compilations / box sets

Singles

Videography

Music videos

DVD

Other appearances

See also
Hydra Head Records discography
Ipecac Recordings discography

References

General

External links
Isis at Discogs

Heavy metal group discographies
Discographies of American artists